Midwife toads are a genus (Alytes) of frogs in the family Alytidae (formerly Discoglossidae), and are found in most of Europe and northwestern Africa. Characteristic of these toad-like frogs is their parental care; the males carry a string of fertilised eggs on their backs, hence the name "midwife". The female expels a strand of eggs, which the male fertilizes externally. He then wraps them around his legs to protect them from predators in the water. When they are ready to hatch, the male wades into shallow water, where he allows the tadpoles to leap out of their eggs. Five separate species of midwife toads are found across western Europe, northern Africa, and Majorca.

Midwife toads can be found in the snows of the Pyrenees, living at heights of 5,000–6,500 feet in areas such as the Néouvielle massif. Unlike the thin tongue of many amphibians, the midwife's tongue is round and flattened; its former family name, Discoglossidae, means "round tongue". In parts of France, midwife toads live in sand dunes by the sea. They share this habitat with natterjack toads.

Description
Five separate species of midwife toads are found across western Europe, northern Africa, and Majorca. Shy, nocturnal animals, they give away their presence by their ringing call. During the day,  midwife toads hide under stones and logs or in tunnels, often in dry, sandy soil, which is easier to dig into using their forelegs and snouts. They emerge at dusk to forage for food, but always returns to the same hiding places before dawn. During the winter, they hibernate in a hole or burrow that has been deserted by a small animal.

Food and feeding
The midwife toad crawls around the area close to its hiding place at night to search for food. The toad uses the end of its long, sticky tongue to pick up prey, including beetles, crickets, flies, caterpillars, centipedes, ants, and millipedes. Tadpoles feed on vegetable matter. They chew with tiny, horny teeth. Young toads eat smaller sizes of the same prey on which adults feed.

Defences
The back of the midwife toad is covered with small warts. These warts give off an odorous poison when the toad is handled or attacked. The poison is so powerful that the toad has few enemies or predators. The poison also helps to keep the egg strings on the male's back safe from attack. The tadpole does not possess the poison, so falls prey to fish and insects.

Adaptations
The Majorcan midwife toad has adapted to the harsh, dry conditions of this Spanish island. It is found only in deep canyons in the northern mountains. It has evolved to have a flatter body, which enables the toad to squeeze into narrow crevices in the rocks of its habitat. The only moisture available is in small, rain-filled puddles on ledges. Tadpoles are born and develop in these pools. Fossils of these species have also been found in Europe.

Species

In laboratories
Apoptosis,  programmed cell death, was first observed in the developing of the tadpoles of the midwife toads 1842 by Carl Vogt.

See also

 Paul Kammerer

References 
 Carl Vogt: Untersuchungen über die Entwicklungsgeschichte der Geburtshelferkröte. (Alytes obstetricians), Solothurn: Jent und Gassman, (1842), p. 130.
 Arthur Koestler, The Case of the Midwife Toad, London:  Hutchinson, 1971.

Alytes
Painted frogs
Amphibians of North Africa
Amphibians of Europe